Azra Akıncı (born May 28, 2003) is a Turkish rhythmic gymnast. She won gold medal in the 3 Hoops + 4 Clubs event at the 2020 Rhythmic Gymnastics European Championships held in Kyiv, Ukraine.

References

External links 
 

2003 births
Living people
Sportspeople from Antalya
21st-century Turkish sportswomen
Medalists at the Rhythmic Gymnastics European Championships
Turkish rhythmic gymnasts